Juan de Salcedo (1549 – March 11, 1576) was a  Novohispanic conquistador. He was born in the kingdom of Mexico in the viceroyalty of New Spain in 1549. He was the grandson of Miguel López de Legazpi and brother of Felipe de Salcedo. Salcedo was one of the soldiers who accompanied the Spanish expeditionary force to the Philippines in 1565. He joined the Spanish military in 1564 for their exploration of the East Indies and the Pacific, at the age of 15. In 1567, Salcedo led an army of about 300 Spanish and Mexican soldiers (Carlos Quirino estimated that over half of the expedition members where Mexicans of various races, mainly Criollo, Mestizo and Indio, with the remaining being Spaniards from Spain) and 600 Visayan allies along with Martín de Goiti for their conquest of Islamic Manila (then under occupation by the Sultanate of Brunei). There they fought a number of battles against the Muslim leaders, mainly against Tarik Sulayman (ironically named from the Arabic طارق بن زياد Tāriq, Islamic conqueror of Spain before the Christian Spanish expelled the Muslims during the Reconquista). The Spanish officers, Mexican recruits and Filipino warriors coalesced in 1570 and 1571 to attack the Islamised areas of Luzon, for control of lands and settlements.

William Scott called Salcedo, "the last of the Conquistadores."  In May 1572, Salcedo led an exploration expedition of 45 Spaniards northward.  Leaving 30 of his men at Vigan, Salcedo proceeded to sail around the northern coast, and down the eastern shore, with 15 men in 2 open boats.  He returned to Manila 3 months later with 50 pounds of gold.

In 1574, Salcedo hurried back to Manila, when that city was threatened by Limahong and he fought with his 600 warriors (300 Mexicans and Spaniards plus 300 local Filipino Militia) against 6,500 Chinese pirates and Japanese Ronins.  After the Spanish success in the Battle of Manila (1574), Salcedo pursued Limahong to Pangasinan in 1575. There the Spaniards besieged  the pirates for four months, before Limahong made good his escape.

Salcedo died in March 1576, probably of dysentery, at the age of 27.

His body is interred at the San Agustin Church in Intramuros.

Romance with Princess Kandarapa 
Local folk legends and a written account by Don Felipe Cepeda, Salcedo's aide, who returned to Acapulco, recount that after the Spanish conquest of Luzon with Mexican and Visayan assistance, and their consequent takeover of the Pasig River delta polity of Hindu Tondo, which was the previous preeminent state in Luzon before the Brunei Sultanate established their puppet-kingdom, Islamic Manila, to supplant Tondo, Juan de Salcedo, then about 22 years old, fell in love with the 18-year-old Dayang-dayang ("Princess") Kandarapa, so named after the lark of the rice fields, who's song she imitated by her beautiful singing voice, was said to be the niece of Lakandula, Tondo's Lakan ("Paramount ruler"). Juan fell in love, upon seeing the femininity of her figure while she and her handmaidens were bathing in the Pasig River. Her goldenbrown skin hinting at other admixtures aside from the Native Malay (North Indian due to the Hindu religion of Tondo and East Asian due to trading links with the Far East). Their love was completely against their forebears' wishes since Lakan Dula wanted his niece, Dayang-dayang Kandarapa, to be married to the Rajah of Macabebe which Kandarapa didn't want as he was already married multiple times to other women due to his Islamic custom; and Miguel Lopez de Legaspi wanted his Mexican grandson, Salcedo, to marry a pure Spanish woman. The Rajah of Macabebe who got word of the budding romance from Rajah Soliman a fellow Muslim Rajah, of Manila, became enraged and he cried out:

Tariq Suleyman then waged the Battle of Bangkusay against the Spaniards, to counter-act which, Miguel Lopez de Legaspi dispatched Martin de Goiti and Juan de Salcedo to the battlefield where they slayed Tariq Suleyman through a cannon shot to the chest, thereby falling overboard to be eaten by the crocodiles he swore by. The Spanish were afterward overloaded with loot and prisoners. Among the detainees were Lakandola's son and nephew, whom Legaspi freed while concealing his knowledge of the rajahs of Tondo's betrayal. De Goite sailed into Bulakan through the twisting channels of the Pampanga, bringing Lakandola and Raja Soliman with them to urge the inhabitants to submit. Legaspi imprisoned Lakandola after he returned to Tondo without authorization despite his eloquence in persuading the other datus to join the Spaniards. When de Goiti and Salcedo returned, of course, Salcedo petitioned for Lakandola's freedom, and he was released.

Afterwards Juan and Kandarapa secretly married, Juan and Kandarapa exchanged letters and rings, hoping that the future will resolve their problems and offer them happiness. Fray Alvarado quickly catechized and baptized Kandarapa, along with many other members of Lakandula's family, and gave Kandarapa the Christian name Dolores. Kandarapa sent Salcedo a message within a cluster of white lotus flowers (The lotus flower is the most sacred flower in Tantric Mysticism since it is pure and beautiful despite growing from the mud of its surroundings. It is simultaneously a chief symbol of the Hindu God Vishnu and associated with Zen Buddhism as well.). However, princess Kandarapa mistakenly thought that Salcedo had been unfaithful to her as a result of the dissaproving Miguel de Legaspi sending his grandson on far flung expeditions to deter his love for Kandarapa, and even lying that his grandson married the daughter of the Rajah of Kaog, Santa Lucia. So, she died of a broken heart. Upon going back from his campaigns, Salcedo learned of her death and yet kept her token of fidelity with him until the end. It is said that when he died in Ilocos, he had in his breast pocket, the dried leaves of the Lotus flowers Kandarapa gave him. This romance, as recorded by Don Felipe Cepeda in Mexico, was picked up by the Catalonian Jesuit, Rev. Fr. Jose Ibañez, who published this romance in Spain.

See also 
 History of the Philippines

References

 Morga, Antonio de.  (2004). The Project Gutenberg Edition Book : History of the Philippine Islands – 1521 to the beginning of the XVII century.  Volume 1 and 2.
 Legazpi, Don Miguel López de. (1563–1572). Cartas al Rey Don Felipe II : sobre la expedicion, conquistas y progresos de las islas Felipinas.  Sevilla, España.

1549 births
1576 deaths
16th-century explorers
16th-century Spanish people
People from Mexico City
Colonial Mexico
Filipino city founders
People of Spanish colonial Philippines
Spanish conquistadors
Burials at San Agustin Church (Manila)
Mexican people of Basque descent
Spanish city founders